Torresi is a surname. Notable people with the surname include:

Alessio Gelsini Torresi (born 1951), Italian cinematographer
Mariano Torresi (born 1981), Argentine footballer

See also
Torres (surname)